

George Graf von Rittberg (30 May 1898 – 6 June 1973) was a German general during World War II who commanded the 88th Infantry Division. He was a recipient of the  Knight's Cross of the Iron Cross with Oak Leaves of Nazi Germany.

Awards and decorations
 Iron Cross (1914) 2nd Class (June 1915) &1st Class  (October 1917)
 Clasp to the Iron Cross (1939) 2nd Class (17 May 1940) & 1st Class (28 May 1940)
 German Cross in Gold on 29 January 1942 as Oberstleutnant in Artillerie-Regiment 131
 Knight's Cross of the Iron Cross with Oak Leaves
 Knight's Cross on 21 February 1944 as Generalmajor and commander of 88. Infanterie Division
 Oak Leaves on 10 October 1944 as Generalmajor and commander of 88. Infanterie Division

References

Citations

Bibliography

 
 
 

1898 births
1973 deaths
Lieutenant generals of the German Army (Wehrmacht)
German Army personnel of World War I
Counts of Germany
Recipients of the Gold German Cross
Recipients of the Knight's Cross of the Iron Cross with Oak Leaves
Military personnel from Strasbourg
People from Alsace-Lorraine
German prisoners of war in World War II held by the Soviet Union
German Army generals of World War II